The women's 4 × 400 metres relay competition at the 2012 Summer Olympics in London, United Kingdom was held at the Olympic Stadium on 10–11 August.

Summary
From the gun USA, Russia and Jamaica were the teams to watch in this final, entering as the reigning gold, silver and bronze medallists respectively from the previous Olympic Games.

From the start Yulia Gushchina of Russia – in lane 5 – went out hard making up the stagger on Christine Day of Jamaica in lane 6. Outside them in lane 7, for the Americans DeeDee Trotter was out conservatively slowly making up ground on Phara Anacharsis of France to her immediate outside.

In the last stages of the opening legs, Trotter for the USA came first into the home straight, pulling away from the entire field. Several metres back Yulia was in second place, Day coming back at her, in bid to win over the silver-medal position. Ukraine was fourth and Great Britain fifth coming in for the first handoffs.

DeeDee handed off first to Allyson Felix – the newly crowned 200-metre champion – who was out flying in a league of her own, widely extending the lead for the USA. Further back Antonina Krivoshapka was going on strong for the Russians, four metres behind her Rosemarie Whyte was in the bronze medal position for Jamaica. Several metres back, Ukraine's Olha Zemlyak was fighting to get back in contention for the bronze medal. 18 metres ahead of the field Felix handed over to Francena McCorory dropping a staggering 48.20s lap, the fastest time since her own time of 48.01s from half a decade ago, at the 2007 World Championships in Osaka.

Miles out in front, the USA were a different class – clearly in their own league – continuing to set the tone for the rest of the pack. The whole field was spread out, Tatyana Firova was in second-place position and Shericka Williams in third for Russia and Jamaica respectively. Ukraine was in fourth place and Great Britain fifth. Nigeria, France and the Czech Republic followed in that order.

Anchoring for the Americans Sanya Richards-Ross dropped a 49.10s leg, the second fastest of the race, giving USA a stress-free victory in the time of 3.16:87, with a 30-metre gap (It was almost  seconds at the finish). Russia was clearly second ahead of Jamaica and Ukraine, each team keeping the same positions from the first handoffs. Nigeria was later disqualified for lane infringement.

The same three countries, USA, Russia and Jamaica, finished in identical places in 2004, 2008 and 2012.  Sanya Richards (Ross) for the US, Tatyana Firova for Russia and Novlene Williams (Mills) for Jamaica have been on all three teams.  Russia has subsequently been disqualified for doping in 2008 and 2012, Firova was one of the athletes involved in the doping.

On 1 February 2017, following retesting of doping samples, Antonina Krivoshapka samples tested positive for dehydrochlormethyltestosterone (turinabol). As they had been disqualified four years earlier, the Russian team again was disqualified. Finally, the bronze medals were reallocated to the Ukrainian team. Another Russian sprinter Yulia Gushchina was found guilty of doping in 2017. Third Russian runner Firova also failed drug tests. Antyukh had her results disqualified for doping as well, on 24 October 2022, which marked the procedure for disqualifying the four Russians span longer than 10 years and 2 months from the initial allotment of medals on 11 August 2012.

Records
, the existing World and Olympic records were as follows.

Schedule

All times are British Summer Time (UTC+1)

Q denotes automatic qualification (based on place).
q denotes provisional qualification (fastest non-automatic qualifiers).
DNS denotes did not start.
DNF denotes did not finish.
DQ denotes disqualified
AR denotes area record.
NR denotes national record.
PB denotes personal best.
SB denotes season's best.

Results

Round 1

Qual. rule: first 3 of each heat (Q) plus the 2 fastest times (q) qualified.

Heat 1

Heat 2

Final

Nigeria originally finished in seventh place in the final but were disqualified due to a lane infringement.

References

Athletics at the 2012 Summer Olympics
Relay foot races at the Olympics
Olympics 2012
2012 in women's athletics
Women's events at the 2012 Summer Olympics